Two ships of the Royal Navy have been named HMS Heather after the flower:

  was an  sloop launched in 1916 and sold in 1932.
  was a  commissioned in 1940 and sold in 1947.

Royal Navy ship names